The IdeaPad Y series was a consumer range of laptops produced by Lenovo, first announced in 2008. They are marketed as premium high performance laptops for multimedia and gaming, as part of the IdeaPad line. The most significant differences from Lenovo's traditional ThinkPad business laptops were a more consumer-oriented appearance and performance-oriented components. IdeaPads feature a chiclet keyboard with rounded keys, similar to the latest ThinkPads. The first of the Y series were the IdeaPad Y710 and the IdeaPad Y510 notebooks, with screen sizes of 17 inches and 15 inches respectively. Not all features were entirely new, however. Notebook Review reported that the Y710 and Y510 notebooks had a keyboard that felt similar to the ThinkPad when used, despite the absence of the TrackPoint. The Y50 and Y40, released in 2014, featured a gaming-oriented design shift and slimming down. The latest release was the Y700 in late 2015.

The IdeaPad Y series has since been replaced by the Legion Y series.

2016

Y900 

Lenovo announced the IdeaPad Y900 in January 2016. It uses Intel Core Gen6 i7 processors that can be overclocked (Lenovo has included utility software to make this easier for users). The chassis is black aluminum with color accents. The keyboard is mechanical. Customizable color LEDs help the touchpad and various parts of the keyboard stand out more clearly in dark environments. The display is 17.3inches, uses an IPS panel with an anti-glare coating, and resolution is  pixels. Up to 64GiB of RAM is supported. Bays are included for two SSDs or hard drives with RAID 0 support. An Nvidia GeForce GTX 980M comes standard with options for either 4GiB or 8GiB of VRAM.

Y700 

The Lenovo IdeaPad Y700 series was a class of gaming PCs. The IdeaPad Y700 series are respectively an 14-inch, 15-inch and 17-inch laptops designed specifically. Same as the IdeaPad 300, 110 and 330 series of home and office laptops, the IdeaPad Y700 series of gaming laptops along with Acer's Predator and Dell's Inspiron and G series gaming laptops. These model have three case versions with 14", 15" and 17" screens; they successor is a Legion Y720 model with similar cases.

2015

Y50-70 
The Y50-70 was released in 2015 as an incremental upgrade to 2014's Y50.

Y70 
The Y70 is a gaming laptop with a 17-inch multitouch screen. As of February 2015, the Y70 base model had a 2.5GHz Intel Core i5 processor, 8GiB of RAM, a 1TB SSD/HDD hybrid, and a 2GiB Nvidia GTX 860M GPU. The display has 1080p resolution and LED backlighting. The Y70 scored 4.5 hours of battery life on MobileMark's Office Productivity Test but is only able to achieve a battery life of about 2.5 hours for gaming.

A review from Notebook Review said, "We're happy to recognize the Lenovo IdeaPad Y70 Touch with our Editor's Choice award for being a great large screen entertainment notebook."

2014
There were two flagship laptops released in 2014  Lenovo Ideapad Y40, Y50 and Y70 Touch.

Y40 and Y50 
Both come with options for multi-touch displays. Both have Intel Core i7 processors. The Y40 uses an AMD Radeon R9 M270 video card with 2 GiB of VRAM; The Y50 uses an Nvidia GeForce GTX 860M video card with options for 2 GiB and 4 GiB of VRAM. Later models now use the Nvidia GeForce GTX 960M video card. They come standard with 8 GiB of RAM (expandable up to 16 GiB). The Y40 comes standard with a 256 GB SSD and the Y50 comes standard with a 1 TB hybrid drive. Neither has an optical drive. The Y40 and Y50 were announced at the 2014 International CES in Las Vegas and went on sale in the United States in May of the same year.

In a review for PC World, Hayden Dingman wrote, 

In a review for LAPTOP, Sherri L. Smith wrote,

Y40
Lenovo Ideapad Y40 was announced in the US on January 5, 2014.

 Processor: Up to 5th Gen Intel Core i7
 Memory: Up to 16GiB DDR3L
 Graphics: Up to AMD Radeon M275
 Storage: Up to 1TB HDD or 1TB + 8GB hybrid SSHD
 Battery: Up to 5 hours' battery life
 Display: 14.1"  LED-backlit TN LCD
 Operating system: Microsoft Windows 8.1
 Weight: Starting at 
 Wireless: Bluetooth 4.02, IEEE 802.11a/b/g/n or 802.11ac Wi-Fi
 Ports: 2 × USB 3.0, 1 × USB 2.0, Audio Combo Jack (headphone and mic), HDMI-out, 4-in-1 (SD / MMC / SDXC / SDHC) card reader, RJ45 gigabit ethernet, SPDIF

Y50

Lenovo IdeaPad Y50 was released in the second quarter of 2014.

 Processor: 4th Gen Intel Core i7-4710HQ (2.5GHz 1600MT/s 6MiB)
 Memory: up to 16GiB PC3-12800 DDR3L SDRAM 1600MT/s
 Storage: 256 or 512GB SSD, or 500GB/1TB 5400RPM + 8GB hybrid SSHD; Optical drive: External BD/DVD
 Graphics: NVIDIA GeForce GTX 860M (2GiB or 4GiB GDDR5)
 Display: 15.6" LED-backlit LCD (or  multitouch)
 Operating system: Microsoft Windows 8.1
 Weight: 
 Keyboard: Backlit AccuType keyboard
 Media: 720p Camera, JBL 2.1 speakers with Dolby Advanced Audio V2
 Battery: Up to 5 hours Wi-Fi browsing depending on configuration
 Wireless: Bluetooth 4.02, IEEE 802.11a/b/g/n or 802.11ac Wi-Fi
 Ports: 2 × USB 3.0, 1 × USB 2.0, Audio Combo Jack (headphone and mic), HDMI-out, 4-in-1 (SD / MMC / SDXC / SDHC) card reader, RJ45 gigabit ethernet, S/PDIF

In 2015, some components were updated with more recent or parts of higher quality:

 IPS LCD panel display instead of TN LCD panel 
 Intel Core i7-4720HQ instead of i7-4710HQ
 NVIDIA GeForce GTX 960M instead of GTX 860M

2013

Y400 
The IdeaPad Y400 was announced at the IFA 2012 show in Berlin Germany. This laptop features a 14-inch display with 1366x768 resolution. It was configured with Intel Core i7 third generation processor and up to 16 GB of RAM. These laptops included the new "Intelligent Touchpad" that was optimized for Windows 8 operating system.  The Y400 weight was around 5.51 pounds with a 6 cell battery.

Y410p
The IdeaPad Y410p was released around June 2013. This laptop also features a fourth generation Haswell Intel Core i7 processor. The Y410p is comparable to higher end laptops such as the Alienware M14x, but this series starts at a comparatively lower price of $799. The Y410p also comes with an UltraBay, which can house a second dedicated graphics card, a hard drive or an exhaust fan; and uses the secure boot UEFI protocol.

Specifications:

 Processor: up to 4th generation Intel Core i7-4700MQ (2.4GHz Quad)
 Memory: up to 8GiB (DDR3 1600MT/s)
 Graphics: Intel HD 4600 + NVIDIA GeForce GT755M 2GiB GDDR5 soldered graphics (and optional UltraBay GPU)
 Operating system: Microsoft Windows 8.1
 Display: 14.1"  or  LED-backlit TN LCD

Y500
The IdeaPad Y500 was released in the first week of January 2013, after Lenovo announced it in late 2012. The Y500 is a Modular laptop, where the BD/DVD drive could be switched out for adding another Graphics card, another Hard Drive, or another exhaust fan with new feature called Always-On USB,a port which will ensure that even when your system is switched off and unplugged from the mains, you will be able to charge your mobile phone or any other compatible USB device.
Y500 Specifications:
 Processor: 3rd Generation Intel Core i7-3630QM (2.4GHz Quad)
 Memory: up to 16GiB (DDR3 1600MT/s)
 Graphics: Intel HD 4000 + NVIDIA GeForce GT 650M (2GiB GDDR5) soldered
 Operating system: Microsoft Windows 8
 Display: 15.6"   LED-backlit TN LCD
 Audio: Premium JBL speakers with Dolby Home Theater v4 sound enhancement

A new version of the Y500 with upgraded features was released in June along with the Lenovo Y410p. The upgraded version has following features compare to older version
 Display:  TN ( was present in older version)
 Graphics: Intel HD 4600 + NVIDIA GeForce GT 750M (NVIDIA GeForce GT 650M was in older version)
 Memory: Up to 8GiB DDR3 (16GiB in older version)

Y510p
The IdeaPad Y510p was released around June 2013. This laptop features a fourth generation Haswell Intel Core i7 processor. The Y510p also comes with an ultrabay, which can house a second dedicated graphics card, a hard drive or an exhaust fan; and uses the secure boot UEFI protocol.

Specifications:
 Processor: 4th Generation Intel Core i7-4700MQ (Quad Core 2.4GHz)
 Memory: Up to 16GiB (DDR3 1600MT/s)
 Graphics: NVIDIA GeForce GT 755M (2GiB GDDR5) GPU, and optional secondary NVIDIA GeForce GT 750M (update GeForce GT 755M) as a UltraBay graphics card
 Display: 15.6"  LED-backlit TN LCD
 Audio: JBL designed speakers supporting Dolby Home Theatre v4 
 Ports: 1 × USB 2.0 (always-on), 2 × USB 3.0, 6-in-1 card reader (SD, SDHC, SDXC, MMC, MS, MS-Pro), headphone, microphone, HDMI,  VGA.
 Operating system: Microsoft Windows 8.0 (can be upgraded to 8.1)

2012
The IdeaPad Y-series laptops released by Lenovo in mid-2012 were the Y480 and Y580. Lenovo followed them up towards the end of the year with the Y400 and the Y500 which had almost similar specifications. The main difference is that the Y400 and Y500 have an ultrabay slot which can be swapped for another hard drive, another fan or another GPU which will work in SLI with the already integrated one to increase performance drastically.

Y480
The Y480 was released in 2012 with the following specifications:
 Processor: Intel 3rd Generation Core i5/i7
 i7-3630QM (Quad-core 2.4GHz, 6MiB L3 cache)
 i7-3610QM (Quad-core 2.3GHz, 6MiB L3 cache)
 i5-3210M (Dual-core 2.4GHz, 6MiB L3 cache)
 Memory: 8GB DDR3 1600MT/s
 Graphics:
 NVIDIA GeForce GT 640M LE (96 Fermi cores, 2GiB GDDR5 VRAM)
 NVIDIA GeForce GT 650M (384 Kepler cores, 2GiB GDDR5 VRAM)
 Display: 14.0"  (169) LED-backlit TN LCD
 Storage:
 1 × 2.5" SATA drive bay:
 5400RPM HDD (500, 750GB, or 1TB)
 1 × mSATA with 32GB SSD
 Dimensions: 345 × 239 × 20–32.8 mm (13.58 × 9.4 × 0.8–1.3 in)
 Weight: 
 Operating system: Microsoft Windows 7 Home Premium

Y580
The Y580 was released in late 2012 with the following specifications:

 Processor: Intel 3rd Generation Core i5/i7
 i7-3630QM (Quad-core 2.4GHz, 6MiB L3 cache)
 i7-3610QM (Quad-core 2.3GHz, 6MiB L3 cache)
 i5-3210M (Dual-core 2.4GHz, 6MiB L3 cache)
 Memory: 8 or 16GB DDR3 1600MT/s (2 slots)
 Graphics: NVIDIA GeForce GTX 660M (384 Kepler cores, 2GiB GDDR5 VRAM)
 Display: 15.6" 169 LED-backlit TN LCD,  or 
 Storage: 
 1 × 2.5" SATA drive bay:
 5400RPM HDD (500, 750GB, or 1TB) or
 7200RPM HDD (500GB)
 1 × mSATA with 32GB SSD
 Dimensions: 385 × 255 × 35.7 mm (15.16 × 10 × 1.4 in)
 Weight: 
 Operating system: Microsoft Windows 7 (Home Premium) or Windows 8

2011
The IdeaPad Y-series laptops released by Lenovo in 2011 were the Y470 and Y570.

Y470
The Y470 was released in 2011 with the following specifications:
 Processor: Intel 2nd Generation Core i3/i5/i7
 Quad-core:
 i7-2720QM (2.2GHz, 6MiB L3 cache)
 i7-2630QM (2.0GHz, 6MiB L3 cache)
 Dual-core:
 i7-2620M (2.7GHz, 4MiB L3 cache)
 i5-2540M (2.6GHz, 3MiB L3 cache)
 i5-2520M (2.5GHz, 3MiB L3 cache)
 i5-2410M (2.3GHz, 3MiB L3 cache)
 i3-2310M (2.1GHz, 3MiB L3 cache)
 RAM: Up to 8GiB DDR3 (1066/1333MT/s)
 Display: 14"  (169) TN LCD
 Graphics: Intel HD 3000 + NVIDIA GeForce 550M (1 or 2GiB VRAM)
 Storage:
 1 × 2.5" SATA drive bay:
 5400RPM HDD (250, 320, 500, 640, 750GB, or 1TB)
 7200RPM HDD (320, 500, 750GB, or 1TB)
 1 × mSATA socket: 
 32 or 64GB mSATA SSD
 Weight: 
 Dimensions: 345 × 239 × 20–32.8 mm (13.58 × 9.4 × 0.8–1.3 in)
 Operating system: Microsoft Windows 7 (Professional or Home Premium)

Y570
The Y570 was released in 2011 with the following specifications:
 Processor: Intel 2nd Generation Core i3/i5/i7 
 Quad-core:
 i7-2920XM (2.5GHz, 8MiB L3 cache)
 i7-2820QM (2.3GHz, 8MiB L3 cache)
 i7-2720QM (2.2GHz, 6MiB L3 cache)
 i7-2630QM (2.0GHz, 6MiB L3 cache)
 Dual-core:
 i7-2620M (2.7GHz, 4MiB L3 cache)
 i5-2540M (2.6GHz, 3MiB L3 cache)
 i5-2520M (2.5GHz, 3MiB L3 cache)
 i5-2430M (2.4GHz, 3MiB L3 cache)
 i5-2410M (2.3GHz, 3MiB L3 cache)
 i3-2310M (2.1GHz, 3MiB L3 cache)
 Memory: Up to 8GB DDR3 (1066/1333MT/s)
 Graphics: Intel HD 3000 + NVIDIA GeForce 555M (1GiB or 2GiB VRAM)
 Display: 15.6"  (169) TN LCD
 Storage:
 1 × 2.5" SATA drive bay
 5400RPM HDD (250, 320, 500, 640, 750GB, or 1TB)
 7200RPM HDD (320, 500, 750GB, or 1TB)
 1 × mSATA socket
 32 or 64GB mSATA SSD
 Weight: 
 Dimensions: 385 × 255 × 22–35.7 mm (15.2 × 10 × 0.87–1.4 in)
 Operating system: Microsoft Windows 7 (Professional, or Home Premium, or Home Basic)

2010
The IdeaPad Y-series laptops released in 2010 by Lenovo were the Y460, Y460p, Y730, Y560p, and Y560d.

Y460 and Y460p

Notebook Review noted that the Y460 offered "great gaming performance", although the system heated up considerably while gaming. The battery life and design were also praised, with the reviewer stating that there was a "huge improvement in the looks department". LAPTOP Magazine offered a similar opinion, stating that, "Lenovo delivers multimedia and gaming power in a portable design, complete with a one-of-a-kind navigation control".

Y560d, Y560 and Y560p

Y730
The Y730 laptop was released as an update to the Y710 laptop, with the most significant differences being a chipset update to Intel PM45 and the ability to use DDR3 memory. The laptop offered:
Processor: Intel Core 2 X9100 (3.06GHz)
RAM: 3GB DDR3
Graphics: ATI Radeon HD 3650 XT
Display: 17" TN LCD
Storage: SATA, Up to 500GB HDD

Reviewers disagreed on its capacity for gaming. About.com indicated that it was not very fast for high resolution PC gaming, suggesting that it was better suited for casual gamers and viewing HD videos. The screen was also indicated as being a lower resolution than industry standard. On the other hand, the reviewer at GADGETBASE was extremely enthusiastic about the laptop, calling it "the ultimate notebook" with "stellar performance" for "a die-hard gamer".

2009
The Y-series laptops launched in 2009 by Lenovo were the Y450 and Y550.

Y450
The successor to the Y430, the Y450 laptop offered the following specifications:
 Processor: Intel Core 2 Duo T6400
 Display: 14"  LED-backlit TN LCD
 Memory: Up to 3GiB DDR3 1066MT/s
 Graphics: Intel GMA 4500MHD (integrated)
 Storage: Up to 250GB 5400RPM SATA
 Wireless: Intel Wireless Wi-Fi Link 5100; Bluetooth Version 2.0 + EDR
 Weight: 
 Dimensions: 
Operating System: Microsoft Windows 7 Home Premium 32-bit or 64-bit

PC World gave the laptop a rating of 2.5 of 5 stars, praising the keyboard, design, and overall value. The negative points were indicated as being an uneven vertical viewing angle.

Y550
Released in 2009, the IdeaPad Y550 laptop offered the following specifications:
 Processor: 2.0GHz Intel Core 2 Duo T6400
 Memory: Up to 8GB DDR3
 Storage: Up to 320GB SATA
 Display:   LED-backlit TN LCD
 Graphics: Intel X4500MHD (integrated)
 Weight: 
 Dimensions: 

Notebook Review called the IdeaPad Y550 laptop well-built, with a wide array of options. The design was also appreciated and as with previous IdeaPad Y Series laptops, both the keyboard and touchpad were positively received.

2008
The Y Series laptops launched in 2008 by Lenovo were the Y710, Y510, Y530, and Y430.

Y430
PC World was enthusiastic in its review of the Y430 notebook, calling it "among the best midsized laptops available" and "a joy to use". Summing up the notebook's capabilities, PC World said, "This is a solidly built unit that's a joy to use and has plenty of grunt for most applications. It also has versatile networking options, including the ability to connect to 5GHz IEEE 802.11n Wi-Fi routers."

Y510
The Y510 notebook offered the following specifications:
 Processor: Intel Core 2 Duo T2330, T5450, or T5550
 Memory: Up to 4GiB
 Graphics: Intel X3100 (integrated, up to 256MiB shared video RAM)
 Display: 15.4"  TN LCD
 Storage: Up to 250GB SATA HDD
 Optical drive: DVD-Burner
 Battery: 6-cell battery, up to 4 hours of life
 Weight: 
 Dimensions: 
 Operating system: Microsoft Windows Vista Home Premium (32-bit)

Y530
The Y530 notebook was the successor to the Y510, with the same chassis but with an upgrade to the Intel Centrino 2 processor. While the notebook was slightly thicker than other, similar laptops, it was still portable and easy to carry around.

Notebook Review stated that the positive points of the Y530 notebook were the build quality, the speaker system, and the comfortable keyboard and touchpad. The negative points were the NVIDIA 9300M graphics card, and the highly reflective display.

Y710
The first type of Y-series laptops was the Y7xx models, including the Y710 and Y730. The Y710 have a optional "Lenovo Game Zone" module (factory mounted in a keypad module space) and offered the following specifications:
 Processor: Intel Core 2 Duo T5450, T8100 or T9300
 Memory: Up to 8GiB DDR2
 Graphics: ATI Mobility Radeon HD 2600 (256MiB VRAM)
 Display: 17"  (1610) TN LCD
 Storage: Up to 100GB SATA HDD
 Optical drive: DVD burner or Blu-ray
 Battery: 6-cell battery, up to 4 hours
 Weight: 
 Dimensions: 
 Operating system: Microsoft Windows Vista Home Premium (32-bit)

References

External links
 IdeaPad Y series on Lenovo.com
 Ideapad Y50 on Lenovo.com
 Ideapad Y40 on Lenovo.com
 Ideapad Y500 on Lenovo.com

Y
Discontinued products